The 2022–23 Detroit Pistons season is the 82nd season of the franchise, the 75th in the National Basketball Association (NBA), and the sixth in Midtown Detroit. The Pistons will attempt to improve on their 23–59 record from last season.

With their loss to the Charlotte Hornets on March 9, the Pistons were officially eliminated from playoff contention.

Draft

The Pistons held the fifth overall pick in the 2022 NBA draft, along with one second-round pick entering the draft.

On draft night, the Pistons traded for Jalen Duren, who was selected by the Charlotte Hornets with the 13th overall pick and subsequently traded to the New York Knicks. Additionally, the 46th pick was traded to the Portland Trail Blazers in exchange for the 36th pick.

Roster

Standings

Division

Conference

Game log

Preseason

|-style="background:#fcc;"
| 1
| October 4
| @ New York
| 
| Jaden Ivey (16)
| Jalen Duren (14)
| Killian Hayes (5)
| Madison Square Garden14,426
| 0–1
|-style="background:#fcc;"
| 2
| October 7
| @ New Orleans
| 
| Saddiq Bey (23)
| Bey, Stewart & Hayes (7)
| Cade Cunningham (8)
| Smoothie King Center13,309
| 0–2
|-style="background:#fcc;"
| 3
| October 11
| Oklahoma City
| 
| Killian Hayes (20)
| Jalen Duren (10)
| Killian Hayes (7)
| Little Caesars Arena8,723
| 0–3
|-style="background:#fcc;"
| 4
| October 13
| Memphis
| 
| Saddiq Bey (17)
| Jalen Duren (12)
| Cory Joseph (7)
| Little Caesars Arena12,104
| 0–4

Regular season

|-style="background:#cfc;"
| 1
| October 19
| Orlando
| 
| Bojan Bogdanović (24)
| Jalen Duren (10)
| Cade Cunningham (10)
| Little Caesars Arena20,190
| 1–0
|-style="background:#fcc;"
| 2
| October 21
| @ New York
| 
| Saddiq Bey (26)
| Stewart & Duren (10)
| Jaden Ivey (9)
| Madison Square Garden19,812
| 1–1
|-style="background:#fcc;"
| 3
| October 22
| @ Indiana
| 
| Cade Cunningham (22)
| Isaiah Stewart (16)
| Bogdanović & Ivey (5)
| Gainbridge Fieldhouse16,056
| 1–2
|-style="background:#fcc;"
| 4
| October 25
| @ Washington
| 
| Bojan Bogdanović (25)
| Isaiah Stewart (10)
| Jaden Ivey (4)
| Capital One Arena13,196
| 1–3
|-style="background:#fcc;"
| 5
| October 26
| Atlanta
| 
| Bojan Bogdanović (33)
| Stewart & Duren (9)
| Cunningham & Joseph (6)
| Little Caesars Arena17,987
| 1–4
|-style="background:#fcc;"
| 6
| October 28
| Atlanta
| 
| Cade Cunningham (35)
| Cade Cunningham (9)
| Cade Cunningham (8)
| Little Caesars Arena18,923
| 1–5
|-style="background:#cfc;"
| 7
| October 30
| Golden State
| 
| Saddiq Bey (28)
| Isaiah Stewart (13)
| Cade Cunningham (9)
| Little Caesars Arena20,190
| 2–5
|-style="background:#fcc;"
| 8
| October 31
| @ Milwaukee
| 
| Cade Cunningham (27)
| Isaiah Stewart (11)
| Cade Cunningham (7)
| Fiserv Forum17,341
| 2–6

|-style="background:#fcc;"
| 9
| November 2
| @ Milwaukee
| 
| Saddiq Bey (22)
| Isaiah Stewart (10)
| Cory Joseph (6)
| Fiserv Forum17,341
| 2–7
|-style="background:#fcc;"
| 10
| November 4
| Cleveland
| 
| Cade Cunningham (19)
| Ivey & Noel (6)
| Cade Cunningham (5)
| Little Caesars Arena18,744
| 2–8
|-style="background:#cfc;"
| 11
| November 7
| Oklahoma City
| 
| Saddiq Bey (25)
| Isaiah Stewart (12)
| Cade Cunningham (7)
| Little Caesars Arena 16,223
| 3–8
|-style="background:#fcc;"
| 12
| November 9
| @ Boston
| 
| Saddiq Bey (18)
| Stewart, Ivey & Duren (10)
| Jaden Ivey (6)
| TD Garden19,156
| 3–9
|-style="background:#fcc;"
| 13
| November 11
| @ New York
| 
| Bojan Bogdanović (25)
| Stewart & Duren (8)
| Killian Hayes (7)
| Madison Square Garden19,812
| 3–10
|-style="background:#fcc;"
| 14
| November 12
| Boston
| 
| Bojan Bogdanović (28)
| Jalen Duren (12)
| Killian Hayes (7)
| Little Caesars Arena20,190
| 3–11
|-style="background:#fcc;"
| 15
| November 14
| Toronto
| 
| Jaden Ivey (21)
| Duren & Bey (6) 
| Jaden Ivey (8)
| Little Caesars Arena16,988
| 3–12
|-style="background:#fcc;"
| 16
| November 17
| @ L.A. Clippers
| 
| Bojan Bogdanović (26)
| Jalen Duren (9)
| Jaden Ivey (5)
| Crypto.com Arena17,822
| 3–13
|-style="background:#fcc;"
| 17
| November 18
| @ L.A. Lakers
| 
| Alec Burks (23)
| Jalen Duren (8)
| Killian Hayes (9)
| Crypto.com Arena18,095
| 3–14
|-style="background:#fcc;"
| 18
| November 20
| @ Sacramento
| 
| Jaden Ivey (24)
| Jalen Duren (8)
| Killian Hayes (6)
| Golden 1 Center17,866
| 3–15
|-style="background:#cfc;"
| 19
| November 22
| @ Denver
| 
| Bojan Bogdanović (22)
| Bojan Bogdanović (9)
| Killian Hayes (9)
| Ball Arena19,635
| 4–15
|-style="background:#cfc;
| 20
| November 23
| @ Utah
| 
| Bojan Bogdanović (23)
| Jalen Duren (7)
| Ivey & Joseph (6)
| Vivint Arena18,206
| 5–15
|-style="background:#fcc;"
| 21
| November 25
| @ Phoenix
| 
| Bojan Bogdanović (19)
| Marvin Bagley III (12)
| Killian Hayes (9)
| Footprint Center17,071
| 5–16
|-style="background:#fcc;"
| 22
| November 27
| Cleveland
| 
| Marvin Bagley III (19)
| Marvin Bagley III (10)
| Killian Hayes (8)
| Little Caesars Arena18,240
| 5–17
|-style="background:#fcc;"
| 23
| November 29
| New York
| 
| Isaiah Stewart (19)
| Marvin Bagley III (7)
| Killian Hayes (6)
| Little Caesars Arena14,864
| 5–18

|-style="background:#cfc;
| 24
| December 1
| Dallas
| 
| Bojan Bogdanović (30)
| Marvin Bagley III (13)
| Killian Hayes (8)
| Little Caesars Arena18,106
| 6–18
|-style="background:#fcc;"
| 25
| December 4
| Memphis
| 
| Saddiq Bey (24)
| Ivey & Bey (6)
| Saddiq Bey (7)
| Little Caesars Arena20,088
| 6–19
|-style="background:#cfc;"
| 26
| December 6
| @ Miami
| 
| Bojan Bogdanović (31)
| Isaiah Stewart (11)
| Killian Hayes (6)
| FTX Arena19,600
| 7–19
|-style="background:#fcc;"
| 27
| December 7
| @ New Orleans
| 
| Saddiq Bey (25)
| Jalen Duren (13)
| Killian Hayes (11)
| Smoothie King Center14,073
| 7–20
|-style="background:#fcc;"
| 28
| December 9
| @ Memphis
| 
| Bojan Bogdanović (19)
| Jalen Duren (12)
| Hayes, Ivey & Joseph (5)
| FedExForum17,103
| 7–21
|-style="background:#fcc;"
| 29
| December 11
| L.A. Lakers
| 
| Bojan Bogdanović (38)
| Jalen Duren (13)
| Killian Hayes (9)
| Little Caesars Arena20,190
| 7–22
|-style="background:#cfc;"
| 30
| December 14
| @ Charlotte
| 
| Alec Burks (27)
| Jalen Duren (19)
| Killian Hayes (8)
| Spectrum Center14,303
| 8–22
|-style="background:#fcc;"
| 31
| December 16
| Sacramento
| 
| Bojan Bogdanović (22)
| Jalen Duren (14)
| Ivey & Joseph (5)
| Little Caesars Arena17,892
| 8–23
|-style="background:#fcc;"
| 32
| December 18
| Brooklyn
| 
| Bojan Bogdanović (26)
| Jalen Duren (11)
| Killian Hayes (8)
| Little Caesars Arena19,488
| 8–24
|-style="background:#fcc;"
| 33
| December 20
| Utah
| 
| Jaden Ivey (30)
| Jalen Duren (14)
| Hayes & Ivey (5)
| Little Caesars Arena15,622
| 8–25
|-style="background:#fcc;"
| 34
| December 21
| @ Philadelphia
| 
| Jaden Ivey (18)
| Marvin Bagley III (10)
| Duren & Hayes (4)
| Wells Fargo Center20,615 
| 8–26
|-style="background:#fcc;"
| 35
| December 23
| @ Atlanta
| 
| Bojan Bogdanović (23)
| Jalen Duren (8)
| Killian Hayes (5)
| State Farm Arena17,028
| 8–27
|-style="background:#fcc;"
| 36
| December 26
| L.A. Clippers
| 
| Bojan Bogdanović (23)
| Jalen Duren (12)
| Killian Hayes (10)
| Little Caesars Arena20,190
| 8–28
|-style="background:#cfc;"
| 37
| December 28
| Orlando
| 
| Alec Burks (32)
| Jalen Duren (18)
| Bojan Bogdanović (5)
| Little Caesars Arena20,190
| 9–28
|-style="background:#fcc;"
| 38
| December 30
| @ Chicago
| 
| Jaden Ivey (22)
| Isaiah Stewart (10)
| Bogdanović & Ivey (6)
| United Center21,667
| 9–29
|-style="background:#cfc;"
| 39
| December 31
| @ Minnesota
| 
| Bojan Bogdanović (28)
| Marvin Bagley III (10)
| Bogdanović & Joseph (5)
| Target Center16,233
| 10–29

|-style="background:#fcc;"
| 40
| January 2
| @ Portland
| 
| Bojan Bogdanović (21)
| Jalen Duren (11)
| |Bogdanović, Duren, Joseph & Burks (3)
| Moda Center19,393
| 10–30
|-style="background:#cfc;"
| 41
| January 4
| @ Golden State
| 
| Bojan Bogdanović (29)
| Jalen Duren (11)
| Killian Hayes (13)
| Chase Center18,064
| 11–30
|-style="background:#fcc;"
| 42
| January 6
| @ San Antonio
| 
| Bojan Bogdanović (21)
| Jalen Duren (9)
| Killian Hayes (7)
| AT&T Center13,107
| 11–31
|-style="background:#fcc;"
| 43
| January 8
| Philadelphia
| 
| Killian Hayes (26)
| Isaiah Stewart (13)
| Ivey & Hayes (6)
| Little Caesars Arena18,898
| 11–32
|-style="background:#fcc;"
| 44
| January 10
| @ Philadelphia
| 
| Bey, Ivey & McGruder (17)
| Hamidou Diallo (8)
| Cory Joseph (8)
| Wells Fargo Center20,221
| 11–33
|-style="background:#cfc;"
| 45
| January 11
| Minnesota
| 
| Saddiq Bey (31)
| Bey & Bogdanović (6)
| Killian Hayes (9)
| Little Caesars Arena15,906
| 12–33
|-style="background:#fcc;"
| 46
| January 13
| New Orleans
| 
| Bojan Bogdanović (22)
| Saddiq Bey (10)
| Ivey & Hayes (6)
| Little Caesars Arena18,989
| 12–34
|-style="background:#fcc;"
| 47
| January 15
| New York
| 
| Bey & Ivey (21)
| Isaiah Stewart (9)
| Killian Hayes (9)
| Little Caesars Arena19,894
| 12–35
|-style="background:#fcc;"
| 48
| January 19
| Chicago
| 
| Bojan Bogdanović (25)
| Jalen Duren (12)
| Killian Hayes (8)
|  Accor Arena15,885
| 12–36
|-style="background:#fcc;"
| 49
| January 23
| Milwaukee
| 
| Bojan Bogdanović (33)
| Jalen Duren (15)
| Jaden Ivey (11)
| Little Caesars Arena18,011
| 12–37
|-style="background:#cfc;"
| 50
| January 26
| @ Brooklyn
| 
| Saddiq Bey (25)
| Saddiq Bey (9)
| Jaden Ivey (8)
| Barclays Center17,732
| 13–37
|-style="background:#fcc;"
| 51
| January 28
| Houston
| 
| Alec Burks (21)
| Jaden Ivey (7)
| Killian Hayes (7)
| Little Caesars Arena19,411 
| 13–38
|-style="background:#fcc;"
| 52
| January 30
| @ Dallas
| 
| Bojan Bogdanović (29)
| Alec Burks (9)
| Killian Hayes (7)
| American Airlines Center19,777
| 13–39

|-style="background:#ccc;"
| —
| February 1
| Washington
| colspan="6" | Postponed due to ice storm (Rescheduled: March 7)
|-style="background:#cfc;"
| 53
| February 3
| Charlotte
| 
| Jaden Ivey (24)
| Isaiah Stewart (16)
| Jaden Ivey (7)
| Little Caesars Arena18,007
| 14–39
|-style="background:#fcc;"
| 54
| February 4
| Phoenix
| 
| Saddiq Bey (25)
| Isaiah Stewart (9)
| Jaden Ivey (6)
| Little Caesars Arena19,788 
| 14–40
|-style="background:#fcc;"
| 55
| February 6
| Boston
| 
| Bojan Bogdanović (21)
| Jalen Duren (14)
| Killian Hayes (9)
| Little Caesars Arena17,933
| 14–41
|-style="background:#fcc;"
| 56
| February 8
| @ Cleveland
| 
| Bojan Bogdanović (15)
| Jalen Duren (9)
| Killian Hayes (6)
| Rocket Mortgage FieldHouse19,432
| 14–42
|-style="background:#cfc;"
| 57
| February 10
| San Antonio
| 
| Bojan Bogdanović (32)
| Jalen Duren (17)
| Jaden Ivey (8)
| Little Caesars Arena17,899
| 15–42
|-style="background:#fcc;"
| 58
| February 12
| @ Toronto
| 
| Bojan Bogdanović (33)
| Hamidou Diallo (7)
| Jaden Ivey (7)
| Scotiabank Arena19,800
| 15–43
|-style="background:#fcc;"
| 59
| February 15
| @ Boston
| 
| Bojan Bogdanović (28)
| Jalen Duren (8)
| Killian Hayes (9)
| TD Garden19,156
| 15–44
|- align="center"
|colspan="9" bgcolor="#bbcaff"|All-Star Break
|-style="background:#fcc;"
| 60
| February 23
| @ Orlando
| 
| Jaden Ivey (25)
| James Wiseman (10)
| Killian Hayes (5)
| Amway Center18,846
| 15–45
|-style="background:#fcc;"
| 61
| February 25
| Toronto
| 
| Marvin Bagley III (21)
| Marvin Bagley III (18)
| Jaden Ivey (10)
| Little Caesars Arena20,190
| 15–46
|-style="background:#fcc;"
| 62
| February 27
| @ Charlotte
| 
| Diallo & Wiseman (23)
| Marvin Bagley III (12)
| Killian Hayes (10)
| Spectrum Center14,184
| 15–47

|-style="background:#fcc;"
| 63
| March 1
| Chicago
| 
| Bojan Bogdanović (34)
| Bagley III & Wiseman (9)
| Killian Hayes (7)
| Little Caesars Arena18,098
| 15–48
|-style="background:#fcc;"
| 64
| March 4
| @ Cleveland
| 
| Marvin Bagley III (20)
| Marvin Bagley III (13)
| Killian Hayes (5)
| Rocket Mortgage FieldHouse19,432
| 15–49
|-style="background:#fcc;"
| 65
| March 6
| Portland
| 
| Isaiah Livers (17)
| Bagley III & Diallo (8)
| Jaden Ivey (13)
| Little Caesars Arena16,989
| 15–50
|-style="background:#fcc;"
| 66
| March 7
| Washington
| 
| Jaden Ivey (26)
| Eugene Omoruyi (6)
| Jaden Ivey (12)
| Little Caesars Arena17,855
| 15–51
|-style="background:#fcc;"
| 67
| March 9
| Charlotte
| 
| Cory Joseph (17)
| James Wiseman (13)
| Jaden Ivey (6)
| Little Caesars Arena17,121
| 15–52
|-style="background:#fcc;"
| 68
| March 11
| Indiana
| 
| Isaiah Livers (18)
| Jalen Duren (11)
| Killian Hayes (13)
| Little Caesars Arena20,190
| 15–53
|-style="background:#cfc;"
| 69
| March 13
| Indiana
| 
| Cory Joseph (22)
| James Wiseman (14)
| Killian Hayes (11)
| Little Caesars Arena18,313
| 16–53
|-style="background:#fcc;"
| 70
| March 14
| @ Washington
| 
| Killian Hayes (20)
| James Wiseman (10)
| Killian Hayes (7)
| Capital One Arena15,279
| 16–54
|-style="background:#fcc;"
| 71
| March 16
| Denver
| 
| Rodney McGruder (20)
| Jalen Duren (13)
| Killian Hayes (7)
| Little Caesars Arena17,987
| 16–55
|-style="background:#fcc;"
| 72
| March 19
| Miami
| 
| James Wiseman (22)
| James Wiseman (13)
| Killian Hayes (11)
| Little Caesars Arena20,190
| 16–56
|-style=
| 73
| March 21
| @ Atlanta
| 
| 
| 
| 
| State Farm Arena
| 
|-style=
| 74
| March 24
| @ Toronto
| 
| 
| 
| 
| Scotiabank Arena
| 
|-style=
| 75
| March 27
| Milwaukee
| 
| 
| 
| 
| Little Caesars Arena
| 
|-style=
| 76
| March 29
| @ Oklahoma City
| 
| 
| 
| 
| Paycom Center
| 
|-style=
| 77
| March 31
| @ Houston
| 
| 
| 
| 
| Toyota Center
| 

|-style=
| 78
| April 2
| @ Orlando
| 
| 
| 
| 
| Amway Center
| 
|-style=
| 79
| April 4
| Miami
| 
| 
| 
| 
| Little Caesars Arena 
| 
|-style=
| 80
| April 5
| Brooklyn
| 
| 
| 
| 
| Little Caesars Arena 
| 
|-style=
| 81
| April 7
| @ Indiana
| 
| 
| 
| 
| Gainbridge Fieldhouse 
| 
|-style=
| 82
| April 9
| @ Chicago
| 
| 
| 
| 
| United Center 
|

Transactions

Overview

Trades

Free agency

Re-signed

Additions

Subtractions

References

Detroit Pistons
Detroit Pistons
Detroit Pistons
Detroit Pistons seasons